Siumut Amerdlok Kunuk  is a football club based in Sisimiut, Greenland. They play in the Coca Cola GM.

Achievements 
Coca Cola GM: 1
Champions : 1974

Football clubs in Greenland
Association football clubs established in 1951
Sisimiut
1951 establishments in Greenland
Handball clubs in Greenland